Amusement is a pleasurable experience.

Amusement may also refer to:

Facilities
Amusement park, an entertainment facility
Amusement center, a small amusement park, often indoors

Media
Amusement (film), a 2009 horror film
Amusement (magazine)
 "Amusement" (song), by Hüsker Dü

Other uses 
Amuse Inc., a Japanese entertainment company

See also 
 
 
 Amuse-bouche